Falk Balzer (born 14 December 1973 in Leipzig) is a former German hurdler, the son of former East German hurdler Karin Balzer. He is best known for winning the silver medal at the 1998 European Championships in Budapest, Hungary. He represented his native country at the 2000 Summer Olympics in Sydney, Australia.

Between 1994 and 1997, Balzer studied philosophy and psychology, then German and history until 2004, when he was awarded a master's degree. He also studied law as a minor subject between 1999 and 2003. During his studies, he was part of the Bundeswehr Frankenberg sports promotion group from 1997 until 2000. In his last year, he was awarded the Cross of Honour of the Bundeswehr in silver.

Doping
Balzer tested positive for nandrolone in January 2001. The German Athletics Federation subsequently handed him a two-year doping ban.

See also
List of doping cases in sport

References

  Profile

1973 births
Doping cases in athletics
German sportspeople in doping cases
Living people
German male hurdlers
Athletes (track and field) at the 2000 Summer Olympics
Olympic athletes of Germany
Athletes from Leipzig
European Athletics Championships medalists
Recipients of the Badge of Honour of the Bundeswehr